The 1897 Rutgers Queensmen football team was an American football team that represented Rutgers University as an independent during the 1897 college football season. The 1897 Rutgers team compiled a 2–6 record and was outscored by opponents by a combined total of 128 to 38. John C. B. Pendleton was the team's coach, and F. K. W. Drury was the team captain.

Schedule

Players
 Decker, right tackle
 F. K. W. Drury, quarterback and captain
 Guthrie, fullback
 McMahon, left guard
 Oram, right halfback
 Patterson, right guard
 Pettit, right end
 Rapalje, left end
 Ryno, left halfback
 Van Winkle, left tackle
 Woodruff, center

References

Rutgers
Rutgers Scarlet Knights football seasons
Rutgers Queensmen football